Pope Benedict XIV (r. 1740–58) created 64 cardinals in seven consistories.

September 9, 1743

 John Theodore of Bavaria
 Joaquín Fernández de Portocarrero
 Camillo Paolucci
 Raffaele Cosimo de' Girolami
 Carlo Alberto Guidoboni Cavalchini
 Giovanni Battista Barni
 Giacomo Oddi
 Federico Marcello Lante
 Marcello Crescenzi
 Giorgio Doria
 Francesco Landi
 Giuseppe Pozzobonelli
 Francesco Ricci
 Antonio Maria Ruffo
 Mario Bolognetti
 Girolamo Colonna di Sciarra
 Prospero Colonna di Sciarra
 Carlo Leopoldo Calcagnini
 Alessandro Tanara
 Filippo Maria de Monti
 Girolamo Bardi
 Luigi Maria Lucini
 Fortunato Tamburini
 Gioacchino Bessozzi
 Domenico Orsini d'Aragona

April 10, 1747

 Álvaro Eugenio de Mendoza Caamaño y Sotomayor
 Daniele Delfino
 Raniero Felice Simonetti
 Frédéric-Jérôme de la Rochefoucauld de Roye
 François-Armand-Auguste de Rohan-Soubise-Ventadour
 Ferdinand Julius von Troyer
 Giovanni Battista Mesmer
 José Manoel da Câmara
 Gian Francesco Albani
 Mario Millini
 Carlo Vittorio Amedeo delle Lanze

July 3, 1747

 Henry Benedict Stuart

November 26, 1753

 Giuseppe Maria Feroni
 Fabrizio Serbelloni
 Giovanni Francesco Stoppani
 Luca Melchiore Tempi
 Carlo Francesco Durini
 Enrico Enríquez
 Cosimo Imperiali
 Vincenzo Malvezzi
 Luigi Mattei
 Giovanni Giacomo Millo
 Clemente Argenvilliers
 Antonio Andrea Galli
 Flavio Chigi
 Giovanni Francesco Banchieri
 Giuseppe Livizzani
 Luigi Maria Torrigiani

April 22, 1754

 Antonino Sersale

December 18, 1754

 Luis Antonio Fernández de Córdoba

April 5, 1756

 Nicolas de Saulx-Tavannes
 Alberico Archinto
 Giovanni Battista Rovero
 Francisco de Solís Folch de Cardona
 Johannes Joseph von Trautson
 Paul d'Albert de Luynes
 Étienne-René Potier de Gesvres
 Franz Konrad Kasimir Ignaz von Rodt
 Francisco de Saldanha da Gama

References

Benedict XIV
College of Cardinals
18th-century Catholicism